Caloptilia scaenica is a moth of the family Gracillariidae. It is known from Madagascar.

References

scaenica
Moths of Madagascar